The comarques of the Valencian Community, form an intermediate level of administrative subdivision between municipalities and provinces. They are used as a basis for the provision of local services by the Generalitat Valenciana, but do not have any representative or executive bodies of their own.

In 1987, the Generalitat Valenciana published an official proposal for Homologated Territorial Demarcations, Demarcacions Territorials Homologades (DTH), of three degrees, where the first degree largely coincides with the territorial concept of comarca. Until now, the practice of these demarcations has been limited as a reference to the administrative decentralisation of the different services offered by the Generalitat, such as education, health, or agriculture. In fact, there is no legal provision for these DTHs to ultimately have the intended “territorial impact”, that is, comarca-level political or administrative bodies. Instead, the powers shared between several municipalities are being articulated through mancomunitats, or commonwealths.

Article 65 of the 2006 Statute of Autonomy provides the first legislative foundation for the comarques.

As of 2019, there are thirty-four comarques (including the city of Valencia), with a median population of 147,227.55 and a median area of 685.43 km².

List of comarques

Subcomarques 
Some comarques are made up of two or more subcomarques. Most of them correspond with local geographical features. For instance, Alcoià is made up of two subcomarques: Foia de Castalla and Valls d'Alcoi.

Historical comarques 
Historical comarques refer to former comarques that are no longer extant.

Some historical comarques of the Valencian Community are now part of other comarques in the new territorial demarcation, such as Tinença de Benifassà and Ports de Morella.

References

Bibliography 
 Proposta de demarcacions territorials homologades, Direcció General d'Administració Local, València, D.L. 1988. Conselleria d'Administració Pública. ISBN 84-7579-587-0